Paulo de Moura is a Portuguese handball coach of the Tunisian national team.

References

Living people
Portuguese handball coaches
Year of birth missing (living people)